Boys' Byte CII class competition at the 2010 Summer Youth Olympics in Singapore took place from August 17 to August 25 at the  National Sailing Centre. 29 sailors competed in this dinghy competition.

Sixteen races were scheduled however, due to bad weather conditions, only 11 races plus the Medal race were contested. Only the 9 best results along with the Medal race result were totaled for the final results.

Medalists

Results 

Race M is the medal race.

Notes

Scoring abbreviations are defined as follows:
OCS – On the Course Side of the starting line
DSQ – Disqualified
DNF – Did Not Finish
DNS – Did Not Start
BFD – Black Flag Disqualification
RAF – Retired after Finishing

References
Fleet Overall

Sailing at the 2010 Summer Youth Olympics
Byte CII competitions